Daniel Widing (born April 13, 1982) is a Swedish professional ice hockey player. He is currently a right winger for Rögle BK in the Swedish Hockey League (SHL). He was originally drafted 36th overall by the Nashville Predators in the 2000 NHL Entry Draft.

Widing joined Skellefteå after a single season in 2013-14 with Finnish Liiga club, Espoo Blues on June 13, 2014.

International play
Widing played for Sweden at the 2001 and 2002 World Junior Ice Hockey Championships, and the 2008 IIHF World Championship.

Career statistics

Regular season and playoffs

International

References

External links

1982 births
Brynäs IF players
HC Davos players
Espoo Blues players
Grizzlys Wolfsburg players
Leksands IF players
Living people
Milwaukee Admirals players
Lahti Pelicans players
Skellefteå AIK players
Swedish ice hockey right wingers
HC TPS players
Djurgårdens IF Hockey players
Nashville Predators draft picks
People from Gävle
Sportspeople from Gävleborg County